Johnny Comes Marching Home is the second album by The Del-Lords. It was released in 1986 on EMI America Records.

Track listing 
All songs written by Scott Kempner, except "Drug Deal" written by The Del-Lords.

Personnel 

The Del-Lords
Scott Kempner – lead vocals, guitar
Eric Ambel – guitar, vocals
Manny Caiati – bass guitar, vocals
Frank Funaro – drums, vocals

Additional musicians and production
Lenny Castro – percussion
Scott Church – assistant engineering
David Eaton – assistant engineering
Michael Frondelli – engineering, mixing
Neil Geraldo – production, mixing
Dave Hernandez – assistant engineering
George Marino – mastering
Jenine Saccente – photography
Brian Scheuble – assistant engineering
George Tutko – engineering
Mark Wilczak – assistant engineering

References

External links 
 

1986 albums
The Del-Lords albums
EMI America Records albums